Guanábano is a barrio in the municipality of Aguada, Puerto Rico. Its population in 2010 was 749.

History
Puerto Rico was ceded by Spain in the aftermath of the Spanish–American War under the terms of the Treaty of Paris of 1898 and became an unincorporated territory of the United States. In 1899, the United States Department of War conducted a census of Puerto Rico finding that the combined population of Guanábano (spelled Guanábanas) and Mal Paso barrios was 723.

Puente de Coloso

Puente de Coloso, a bridge used during the height of sugarcane production in Puerto Rico, is located in Guanábano over the Culebrinas River.

Sectors
Barrios (which are like minor civil divisions) in turn are further subdivided into smaller local populated place areas/units called sectores (sectors in English). The types of sectores may vary, from normally sector to urbanización to reparto to barriada to residencial, among others.

The following sectors are in Guanábano barrio:

In Guanábano barrio is part of the Luyando community.

See also

 List of communities in Puerto Rico
 List of barrios and sectors of Aguada, Puerto Rico

References

External links
 

Barrios of Aguada, Puerto Rico